is a Japanese professional wrestler, better known by his ring name Gorgeous Matsuno, currently working for the Japanese professional wrestling promotion DDT Pro-Wrestling (DDT).

Professional wrestling career

Independent circuit (2001–present) 
Matsuno is a comedy wrestler and sticks up to a gimmick of an old man taking wrestling to a funny extent. Unlike other wrestlers, he made his professional wrestling debut in 2001 at the late age of 39, however, his first documented match was back at the IWA Japan 8th Anniversary Show on October 10, 2002 where he teamed up with Yuji Kito and Tiger Jeet Singh to face Tatsukuni Asano, Ryo Miyake and The Great Kabuki in a six-man tag team match. He is known for tenures with various promotions such as Dragon Gate where he worked in a cross-over event with DDT, the Dragon Gate/DDT Dramatic Dream Gate Returns from May 6, 2012, in which he teamed with Rich Swann and Ryo Jimmy Saito in a losing effort to Don Fujii, Antonio Honda and Danshoku Dino. Matsuno participated in the Futaritabi Tag Tournament 2019 of Michinoku Pro Wrestling where he teamed up with Jinsei Shinzaki, falling short to Yapper Man I and Yapper Man II in the semi-finals on October 14, 2019.

Dramatic Dream Team (2003-present)
At DDT 8th Anniversary: Judgement 9 on March 27, 2005, Matsuno teamed up with Danshoku Dino and Muscle Sakai to defeat Akeomi Nitta, Giant and Jun Inomata in a Six-man tag team match. Matsuno is a former O-40 Champion, title which he won at Who's Gonna Top? 2019 on September 29, 2019 after defeating Sanshiro Takagi. He eventually lost it 406 days later at DDT TV Show! #11 from November 8, 2020 to Toru Owashi. Matsuno also won the KO-D 6-Man Tag Team Championship alongside Brahman Kei and Brahman Shu at God Bless DDT 2014 on November 30 after defeating T2Hii (Kazuki Hirata, Sanshiro Takagi and Toru Owashi). Matsuno is a former multiple time Ironman Heavymetalweight Champion. He competed in a falls count anywhere four-way tag team match to promote the protection of the elderly people from the Coronavirus in which he teamed up with Gabai Ji-chan to defeat Konosuke Takeshita and Shunma Katsumata, Chris Brookes and Mike Bailey, and Shinya Aoki and Makoto Oishi on March 30, 2020. He also works in singles matches as a sole wrestler, of these matches being at DDT TV Show! #12 on November 14, 2020, where he fell short to Danshoku Dino.

Personal life
Mastuno was a collateral victim of the East Japan Earthquake and he stated that his home was briefly affected by the natural disaster back in 2011.

Championships and accomplishments
'''Dramatic Dream Team/DDT Pro Wrestling
KO-D 6-Man Tag Team Championship (1 time) - with Brahman Kei and Brahman Shu
O-40 Championship (1 time)
Ironman Heavymetalweight Championship (18 times)

References

External links
 

1961 births
Living people
Japanese male professional wrestlers
21st-century professional wrestlers
Ironman Heavymetalweight Champions
KO-D 6-Man Tag Team Champions